Borris may refer to:

Place in Denmark
Borris, Ringkøbing-Skjern Municipality, a small railway town in western Jutland, Denmark

Places in Ireland
Borris, Twomileborris, County Tipperary, a townland
Borris, Roscrea, County Tipperary, a townland
Borris, County Carlow
Borris, County Laois, a civil parish in County Laois
Borris Great, Borris, County Laois, a townland in the above civil parish 
Borris Little, Borris, County Laois, a townland in the above civil parish 
Borris-in-Ossory, County Laois
Borrisokane, County Tipperary
Borrisoleigh, County Tipperary
Borrisleigh, a civil parish in County Tipperary
Borrisoleigh and Ileigh, a Catholic parish in County Tipperary
Borris-Ileigh GAA, a Gaelic games club
Two-Mile Borris, a village in County Tipperary
Twomileborris (electoral division), County TipperaryĎ

People
Borris Miles (born 1965), American politician
Jeff Borris (born 1962), baseball agent
Karl Borris (19161981), German ace pilot in WWII
Ryan Borris (born 1983), Scottish footballer
Siegfried Borris (1906–1987), German composer, musicologist and music educator

See also
Boris (disambiguation)